The NBL Grand Final is the annual championship series of the National Basketball League (NBL). The entrants are determined by the victors of the two Semi Finals series, who engage in a best-of-five game series to determine the league champion. The winners of the Grand Final series are awarded the Dr John Raschke Trophy.

History
Prior to 1986, the NBL Grand Final was decided by a single game. From 2004 until 2009, the series was expanded to a best-of-five games.

The first NBL Grand Final was played on 10 June 1979 at the Albert Park Basketball Stadium in Melbourne. The St. Kilda Saints defeated the Canberra Cannons 94-93 to become the inaugural NBL Champions.

The Perth Wildcats hold the record for most Grand Final appearances with 15 between 1987 and 2019/20. They have also won a record 10 NBL Championships. The Wildcats have not missed the NBL Finals since 1987, a record of 35 consecutive years.

No Grand Final MVP was awarded between 1981 and 1985. The NBL Grand Final Most Valuable Player Award winner receives the Larry Sengstock Medal, which is named in honour of Larry Sengstock, the winner of the league's first Grand Final MVP award in 1986.

Rocky Smith (1980), Leroy Loggins (1987), Scott Fisher (1989), Chris Williams (2002/03), Chris Anstey (2005/06) and Cedric Jackson (2012/13) all won the Grand Final MVP and the regular season MVP awards in the same season.

Results

Grand Final Record 

* Teams in bold are currently in the NBL.

See also

NBL Finals
WNBL Grand Final

References

External links

National Basketball League (Australia)
Grand finals
Recurring sporting events established in 1979
1979 establishments in Australia